Statistics of the Primera División de México for the 1947–48 season.

Overview
It was contested by 15 teams, and León won the championship.

Teams

League standings

Results

Playoff

References
Mexico - List of final tables (RSSSF)
Mexico 1947/48 (RSSSF)

1947-48
Mex
1947–48 in Mexican football